German Order refers to:
German Order (decoration), the highest decoration that the Nazi Party could bestow on an individual
Germanenorden (German Order), the völkisch secret society in early 20th-century Germany
Another name for the Teutonic Knights